Bhabrasur is a village in Gopalganj District, Bangladesh, part of Muksudpur Upazila and Bhabrasur Union.

Non-governmental organizations operating in Bhabrasur include BDAO (the Bangladesh Development Acceleration Organisation), BRAC, CCDB, ASA, World Vision, and HCCB.

Agriculture
The main crops grown in Bhabrasur are paddy, wheat, jute, sugarcane, onion, garlic, betel leaf, vegetables and sweet potato. Formerly, the village also grew linseed, sesame, indigo, china, kaun, but these are rarely grown anymore.

Bhabrasur also produces the fruits Mango, jackfruit, papaya, palm, guava, lemon, litchi, coconut, guava, and banana.

There are fisheries, hatcheries, poultry and dairy farms in Bhabrasur. Some fishermen depend on the waters of the local pond, bills and river for their livelihood.

References
 Bangladesh Population Census- 2001, Community Series; District: Gopalgonj | November 2006 | Bangladesh Bureau of Statistics, Planning Division, Ministry of Planning, Government of the People's Republic of Bangladesh. 
 Bangladesh Development Acceleration Organization, (BDAO)

Populated places in Dhaka Division